Impavido was the name of at least three ships of the Italian Navy and may refer to:

 , a  launched in 1913 and discarded in 1937.
 , a  launched in 1943. Seized by Germany and renamed TA23 in September 1943. She was sunk in 1944.
 , a  launched in 1962 and decommissioned in 1992.

Italian Navy ship names